Kolkata is located in the eastern part of India. It has spread linearly along the banks of Hooghly River. The Kolkata Municipal Corporation has an area of 205 square kilometres. The city is near sea level, with the average elevation being 17 feet. The whole area is in the Ganges Delta which starts within 100 km south to the city. Most of the city was originally marshy wetlands, remnants of which can still be found especially towards the eastern parts of the city.

Geology
Indo-Gangetic Plain, the soil and water are predominantly alluvial in origin. Kolkata is located over the "Bengal basin", a pericratonic tertiary basin. Bengal basin comprises three structural unit: shelf or platform in the west; central hinge or shelf/slope break; and deep basinal part in the east and southeast. The shelf and hinge zones have many faults, among them some are active.
The quaternary sediments consist of clay, silt, and several grades of sand and gravel.

City geography

The city is fringed by extensive mangrove ecosystems and tidal flats.

Urban structure

The urban agglomeration encompassed 72 cities and 527 towns and villages, . Suburban areas in the Kolkata metropolitan area incorporate parts of the following districts: Kolkata, North 24 Parganas, South 24 Parganas, Howrah, Hooghly and Nadia. The north–south distance is greater, and its axis is used to section the city into North, Central and South Kolkata. East Kolkata is also a section.

North Kolkata 

North Kolkata is the oldest part of the city. Characterised by 19th-century architecture, all includes areas such as Shyambazar, Hatibagan, Maniktala, Kankurgachi, Rajabazar, Shobhabazar, Shyampukur, Tala, Sonagachi, Kumortuli, Bagbazar, Jorabagan, Burrabazar, Jorasanko, Phoolbagan, Ultadanga, Chitpur, Pathuriaghata, Cossipore, Belgachia and Sinthee.

Central Kolkata 

Central Kolkata hosts the central business district. It contains B. B. D. Bagh, formerly known as Dalhousie Square, and the Esplanade on its east; Strand Road is on its west. The West Bengal Secretariat, General Post Office, Reserve Bank of India, High Court, Lalbazar Police Headquarters, and several other government and private offices are located there. Another business hub is the area south of Park Street, which comprises thoroughfares such as Chowringhee, Camac Street, Wood Street, Loudon Street, Shakespeare Sarani and A. J. C. Bose Road. The Maidan is a large open field in the heart of the city that has been called the "lungs of Kolkata" and accommodates sporting events and public meetings. The Victoria Memorial and Kolkata Race Course are located at the southern end of the Maidan. Other important areas of Central Kolkata are Park Circus, Sealdah, Beliaghata, College Street, Burrabazar, Bowbazar, Taltala, Janbazar, Entally, Chandni Chowk, Lalbazar, Chowringhee, Dharmatala, Rabindra Sadan, Tiretti Bazaar, Bow Barracks, Babughat, Princep Ghat and Hastings. Another important park is Millennium Park on Strand Road, beside the Hooghly River. Fort William, on the western part of the city (besides Maidan), houses the headquarters of the Eastern Command of the Indian Army.

South Kolkata 

South Kolkata developed mainly after India gained independence in the year 1947. It includes upscale neighbourhoods such as Ballygunge, Behala, Thakurpukur, Alipore, New Alipore, Lansdowne, Bhawanipore, Kalighat, Gariahat, Charu Market, Chetla, Jodhpur Park, Lake Gardens, South City, Jadavpur, Dhakuria, Tollygunge, Joka, Pailan and Amtala .

East Kolkata 

East Kolkata is largely composed of newly developed areas like Topsia, Picnic Garden, Tangra, Gobra, Kustia, Tiljala, Anandapur, East Kolkata Twp, Panchasayar, Madurdaha, Nayabad, Kalikapur,  Purbalok, Mukundapur, Ajoy Nagar, Hiland Park, Chak Garia, Patuli, Budherhat, Nayabad and New Garia. Outlying developing areas include Dhapa, Uttar Panchannagram, Chowbaga, Bantala and VIP Nagar. In the pace of rapid urbanization and growing demand for housing and commercial spaces, the New Town, Kolkata was created in the eastern outskirts of Kolkata to serve the dual purposes of establishing new business centre to reduce the mounting pressure on the existing Central Business Districts (CBD) and increasing housing stock supply by creating new residential units.

Howrah and Hooghly (Urban) 

Technically Howrah and the urban part of Hooghly all have individual identity alongside they are the part of Kolkata Metropolis. Likewise Howrah city is a twin city of Kolkata city. Nabanna, Santragachi, Belur, Bally, Uttarpara, Konnogar, Rishra, Serampore, Bhadeswar, Chinsurah, Hooghly, Chandannagor and Bandel all cities under Kolkata Metropolitan Area, having own fragrance of history, culture. This area is called "Little Europe Of India". All areas are well connected with the city centre.

Climate 

Kolkata has a Tropical wet-and-dry climate, with summer monsoons. The annual mean temperature is 26.8 °C (80 °F); monthly mean temperatures range from 19 °C to 30 °C (67 °F to 86 °F) and maximum temperatures can often exceed 40 °C (104 °F) during May–June. Winter tends to last from December to early-February, with the lowest temperatures hovering in the 12 °C — 14 °C range during December and January. The highest recorded temperature is 43 °C (111 °F) and the lowest is 5 °C (41 °F).

Monsoon is the most notable phenomenon in the climate of the city. Maximum rainfall occurs during the monsoon in August (306 mm) and the average annual total is 1,582 mm. Early morning mists and evening smog occur often due to temperature inversions. Summer is dominated by strong southwesterly monsoon winds. The city's total duration of sunshine is 2,528 hours per annum, with the maximum insolation occurring in March. Often during early summer, spells of thunderstorm and heavy rains lashes the city, bringing some relief from the heat and intolerable humidity. These thunderstorms are locally known as Kalbaishakhi (Nor-wester). According to a United Nations Development Programme report, its wind and cyclone zone is "very high damage risk".

Notes